Zehdenick is a town in the Oberhavel district, in Brandenburg, Germany. Since 31 July 2013, the city has the additional appellation "Havelstadt".

Geography
Zehdenick is located about 60 km north of Berlin on the Havel. It forms the northern starting point of the natural region of the Zehdenick-Spandauer Havelniederung. East extends the Schorfheide-Chorin Biosphere Reserve. The urban area belongs mainly to the historical landscape Uckermark. The subdivisions Marienthal and Ribbeck pertain to the Ruppiner Land, Mildenberg and Zabelsdorf to the Land Löwenberg. Zehdenick has a share in the Naturschutzgebiet Kleine Schorfheide.

Subdivision
The urban area of Zehdenick next to the core city Zehdenick includes 13 villages:

Besides these Ortsteile (districts), there are several smaller inhabited places: Amt Mildenberg, Ausbau (District Ribbeck), Ausbau (Core city Zehdenick), Bergluch, Boddin, Burgwaller Försterei, Deutschboden, Eichholz, Försterei Blockhaus, Großenhof, Hammelstall, Hellberge, Karlshof, Lüthkeshof, Mahnhorst, Mutzer Plan, Neuhof, Osterne, Revierförsterei Wolfsgarten, Rieckesthal, Siedlung II, Wolfsgarten, Ziegelei, Ziegelei Abbau and Ziegelei Ausbau.

Demography

History
Zehdenick was first mentioned in documentary on 28 December 1216. Zehdenick was at that time a fishing town. Ascanians built a castle here to protect against Pomeranians and Danes.

As a city, Zehdenick was first denoted in 1281.

Abbey
Zehdenick is the site of the former Cistercian nunnery, Zehdenick Abbey.

Twin cities

Zehdenick is twinned with:
 Castrop-Rauxel, Germany
 Siemiatycze, Poland (since 10 March 2007)

Notable residents
 Paul Georg von Möllendorff (1847–1901), German linguist and diplomat in East Asia
 Marianne Grunthal (1896–1945), teacher, victim of the SS
 Karl Frenzel (1911–1996), SS-Oberscharführer, participant in the Action T4 and section commander in Sobibor extermination camp
 Sebastian Mielitz (born 1989), soccer player
 Sten Nadolny (born 1942), writer
 Günther Morbach (1927–2009), classical bass
 Josefine Preuß (born 1986), actress

Photogallery

References

External links

Localities in Oberhavel